Chants is a piano trio album by American jazz pianist and composer Craig Taborn, recorded in June 2012 and released on the ECM label. It features Taborn on piano, with Thomas Morgan on bass, and Gerald Cleaver on drums. The album was recorded in New York City. The compositions were written by Taborn for the band over their eight years of existence.

Reception
The Allmusic review by Thom Jurek awarded the album four stars, stating "Chants is a strong statement from Taborn both as a composer and bandleader, but it's also a dialogue on the trio format itself, as articulated by this vastly talented, thought-provoking group." The Financial Times also gave it four stars out of five, describing it as "Exuberant trio music with an exceptional group dynamic". All About Jazz critic John Kelman praised the album, writing, "Chants is an album that augments the label's already vast collection of piano trio recordings with an unmistakably personal album whose hidden beauty unveils itself further with each and every listen." Down Beat awarded it 4.5 stars, stating that the album "is original to its core". The album was also nominated for "Record of the Year" 2014 by the Jazz Journalists Association (but lost to Wayne Shorter's Without a Net).

Track listing
All compositions by Craig Taborn.

 "Saints" – 5:22
 "Beat the Ground" – 4:03 
 "In Chant" – 8:21 
 "Hot Blood" – 3:52 
 "All True Night/Future Perfect" – 12:46 
 "Cracking Hearts" – 7:08 
 "Silver Ghosts" – 7:36 
 "Silver Days or Love" – 8:24 
 "Speak the Name" – 6:57

Personnel
Craig Taborn – piano
Thomas Morgan – bass
Gerald Cleaver – drums

Charts

References

External links
 Chants ECM EPK

ECM Records albums
Craig Taborn albums
2013 albums
Albums produced by Manfred Eicher